Johannes, Count van den Bosch  (2 February 1780 – 28 January 1844) was a Dutch officer and politician. He was Governor-General of the Dutch East Indies (1830–1833), commander of the Royal Netherlands East Indies Army, Minister of Colonies, and Minister of State. He was an officer in the Military William Order.

Biography
Johannes van den Bosch was born on 2 February 1780 in Herwijnen in the Dutch Republic (the present-day Netherlands), to the physician Johannes van den Bosch Sr. and his wife Adriana Poningh.

Van den Bosch enrolled in the army of the Batavian Republic in 1797 and was, at his own request, sent to Batavia in the Dutch East Indies as a lieutenant a year later. At the time, the emphasis was put on asserting commercial interest, and Dutch control over the Indonesian archipelago was limited. As an adjutant, Van den Bosch remained close to the consecutive Governor-Generals, and was involved in the transformation from trade colonialism to territorial colonial expansion. In 1808, he had a conflict with the new Governor-General, Herman Willem Daendels, after which he was honourably discharged from service at the rank of colonel. He and his family were sent back to Europe in 1810.

On his way back to the Netherlands, Van den Bosch was captured by the British and remained a captive until 1812. Upon arriving in the Netherlands, he joined the provisional government tasked with restoring the authority of the Prince of Orange, William Frederick. He was recommissioned in the army as a colonel and, in the name of the Prince of Orange, captured Utrecht and Naarden. In 1818, Van den Bosch was involved in the establishment of the Society of Humanitarianism, under the auspices of Prince Frederick, and was put on inactive in the military in order to focus on the society. The society considered labour to be the only means to combat poverty. In Drenthe, it founded the 'free colonies' of Frederiksoord, Willemsoord and Wilhelminaoord, where the poor from big cities would learn to care for themselves in a disciplined manner.

In 1827, Van den Bosch was tasked with restoring Dutch control over the West Indies as commissioner-general. He left the society and arrived on Curaçao in December that year, and would stay in the colony for eight months. During this period, he took several initiatives concerning trade and banking, focussed on stimulating economic activity and scope of the colony. Among other things, he introduced a regulation which would make the Constitution of the Netherlands apply to the colony as well, and used it to attempt to improve the living conditions of slaves. Only shortly after his return in 1828, Van den Bosch rose to the rank of lieutenant general and was appointed Governor-General of the Dutch East Indies. In this capacity, he is most famous for the introduction of the cultivation system in 1830. This system forced Javanese farmers to use a fifth of their farmland for export goods such as coffee, sugar and indigo.

Van den Bosch returned to the Netherlands on 18 May 1834 and was appointed Minister of Colonies on 30 May. As Minister, he demanded increasingly high financial results from the colonies, often to the detriment of the interest of individual farmers and slaves. In 1839, he received criticism from the House of Representatives for the opaqueness of his policy on loans between the government and the Netherlands Trading Society. Van den Bosch voluntarily stepped down from office on 1 January 1840, upon which he was granted the title Count van den Bosch by royal decree, as well as the honourable title of Minister of State. He entered the House of Representatives for South Holland in 1842 and would remain there until his death.

Count van den Bosch died on 28 January 1844 at his estate in The Hague, as a result of a short disease.

Titles
 17 June 1835: elevated into the Dutch nobility with the title of Baron
 25 December 1839: created Count (Dutch: Graaf)

See also
Landrentestelsel
Frederiksoord
Society of Humanitarianism

References
The information in this article is based on that in its Dutch and German equivalents.
The Meyers Konversations-Lexikon

External links

 Dutch Parliament:  J. graaf van den Bosch
 Johannes van den Bosch

1780 births
1844 deaths
People from Lingewaal
Governors-General of the Dutch East Indies
Royal Netherlands East Indies Army generals
Royal Netherlands East Indies Army officers
Ministers of Colonial Affairs of the Netherlands
Counts of the Netherlands
Dutch military personnel of the Napoleonic Wars